Alexander Marcial (born 30 March 1949) is a Filipino former professional tennis player.

Marcial was a Davis Cup player for the Philippines between 1969 and 1982, featuring in a total of 11 ties, for wins in three singles and five doubles rubbers. At the 1981 Southeast Asian Games in Manila, Marcial claimed gold medals in both the men's doubles and mixed doubles events. On the professional tour he had a best singles world ranking of 262, which he reached in 1974.

References

External links
 
 
 

1949 births
Living people
Filipino male tennis players
Southeast Asian Games medalists in tennis
Southeast Asian Games gold medalists for the Philippines
Southeast Asian Games silver medalists for the Philippines
Southeast Asian Games bronze medalists for the Philippines
Competitors at the 1981 Southeast Asian Games
Competitors at the 1983 Southeast Asian Games
20th-century Filipino people